Luna Nueva (New Moon) is the debut album by Costa Rican singer-songwriter and dancer Debi Nova. It was released on May 18, 2010. The first single from the album was titled "Drummer Boy". The album was produced by the famous producer Gustavo Santaolalla.

The album has 10 tracks, all of them co-written by Debi. The EPK of the album is available on her YouTube channel or on her official web site. Among the writers who participated in the songwriting is renowned names such as Louis Biancaniello, Sam Watters, Greg Kurstin and Beto Cuevas (formerly of Chilean group La Ley). The album has an important collaboration with Citizen Cope on track nine. The album has most tracks in English, but it also includes some tracks on Spanish and Spanglish.

Track listing

Charts

References

2010 debut albums